is a Japanese women's professional wrestling video game series.

Games

References

External links 
 Wrestle Angels series at MobyGames

Video game franchises
Video game franchises introduced in 1992
Video games developed in Japan
Video games featuring female protagonists
Single-player video games
Professional wrestling games
Women's professional wrestling